The Canton of Amiens-1 is a canton situated in the department of the Somme and in the Hauts-de-France region of northern France.

Geography 
The canton covers the northwestern part of the commune of Amiens in the arrondissement of Amiens.

See also
 Arrondissements of the Somme department
 Cantons of the Somme department
 Communes of the Somme department

References

Amiens 1st (Ouest) Canton
Canton 1